Johannes Mensing (Mensingk) (1477–1547) was a German Dominican theologian and controversialist, an opponent of Martin Luther. He was considered formidable for his theological knowledge and command of the German language.

Life
Mensing was born at Zutphen or Zwolle, Netherlands.  In 1495 he entered the Dominican Order and made part of his theological studies in the studium of his province. Matriculating at the University of Wittenberg in 1515, he received there in 1517 the licentiate in theology, and the following year received in Frankfort-on-the-Oder the doctorate in theology from the hands of the general of his order. According to Quétif, he taught theology in 1514 in the monastery at Ulm;, but it is however improbable that Mensing, belonging to the province of Saxony, should act as professor in another province which had no studium generale of its own.

To prevent Lutheran doctrinal innovations from gaining a foothold in his province, Mensing entered into all the controversies. From 1522 to 1524 he occupied the pulpit in the cathedral of Magdeburg, where he also composed his first apologetic works on the Sacrifice of the Mass. He was forced to leave, and took up the invitation of the Princess Margaretha von Anhalt, who ruled during the minority of her sons; he went to Dessau to support her in her efforts against Protestants in her territory.

In 1529 he was professor in the University of Frankfort-on-the-Oder and preacher in the cathedral. The following year he attended, as theologian to the Elector Joachim von Anhalt, the Diet of Augsburg, and secured from Emperor Charles V a renewal of the letter of protection for the Dominican Order in Germany which Emperor Charles IV had granted them in 1355 and 1359.

In 1534 he was elected provincial of his own province, but before the termination of his office Pope Paul III made him suffragan Bishop of Halberstadt. In 1540 and 1541 he attended the theological conferences of Worms and Ratisbon, where with Johann Eck, the vice-chancellor of the University of Ingolstadt, and Pelargus, he took a leading part in the deliberations.

Works

A complete list of his works, all of which bear a polemical tinge, is given by Streber in the Kirchenlexikon.

References

Attribution
 The entry cites:
Quétif-Échard, SS. Ord. Praed., II, 84;
Paulus, Die deutschen Dominikaner im Kampfe gegen Luther (Freiburg, 1903), 16-45; 
Paulus, Katholik (1893), II, 21-36, 120-139.

External links 
 Catholic Hierarchy page
 

1477 births
1547 deaths
16th-century Dutch people
16th-century German Catholic theologians
German Dominicans
People from Zutphen
People from Zwolle
German male non-fiction writers
16th-century German male writers